Pakistan International Airlines Flight 8303 was a scheduled domestic flight from Allama Iqbal International Airport in Lahore to Jinnah International Airport in Karachi, Pakistan. On 22 May 2020, the Airbus A320 crashed into Model Colony, a densely populated residential area of Karachi only a few kilometres (miles) from the runway, while on a second approach after a failed landing with landing gear not deployed. Of the 91 passengers and 8 crew on board the aircraft, 97 were killed, and two passengers survived with injuries. Eight people on the ground were also injured in the accident, one of whom later succumbed to her injuries.

Accident 
The aircraft's wings were reported as being on fire in the moments before the plane crashed into rooftops. The crash damaged buildings in the area, some of which caught fire. The crash was captured on video by a CCTV camera of a nearby building, which shows the aircraft just before crashing into the neighborhood.

The aircraft initially made an aborted landing attempt, apparently with the landing gear not deployed. One of the pilots subsequently radioed air traffic control (ATC) reporting landing gear issues and the failure of both engines. ATC confirmed to the pilot that he was cleared to use either of the airport's two runways, requesting, "Confirm your attempt on belly?" According to PIA's CEO, Arshad Malik, a technical fault prompted the aircraft to make a go-around rather than land, even though both runways were available. One of the pilots told the controller, "we are returning back, sir, we have lost engines." Twelve seconds later, one of the pilots declared a mayday emergency, which was the final communication with the aircraft.

According to officials from Pakistan's Civil Aviation Authority (CAA), complications had arisen during the aircraft's first descent. The landing gear was still in the retracted position when the aircraft attempted its first landing. Friction marks on the runway suggested there had been some ground contact; at the runway's  mark, the plane's left engine is believed to have scraped the runway; at the  mark, the right engine made contact. When the pilot went around, it is believed damage had already been caused to both engines from this contact, leading to engine failure after the go-around. This made it impossible for the aircraft to maintain altitude, causing it to crash during its return to the airfield. This is supported by the conversation between the aircraft and air traffic control which indicates that the aircraft was constantly losing altitude. Observers noted that the plane's backup ram air turbine (RAT) was deployed, the purpose of which is to supply power to the aeroplane's control systems when both engines have failed and without the auxiliary power unit (APU) running.

The Economic Times, an Indian publication, reported that the pilots had ignored warnings from air traffic control about the height and speed of the aircraft on approach. Instead of descending, one of the pilots responded by saying that he was satisfied with the descent profile. ATC issued a second instruction to turn to descend. One of the pilots responded again by stating that he was satisfied and able to handle the situation, and that he was prepared for landing. The pilot had a flying experience of 18,000 flight hours.

The narrow streets and alleys comprising the area inhibited the rescue services. ISPR, the Pakistani military's media wing, reported that special forces of the Pakistan Army and Pakistan Rangers had set up a cordon. Video footage of the crash scene showed emergency teams trying to reach the scene amid the rubble, clouds of black smoke and flames in the background.

Residents said it is not uncommon for aircraft on final approach to pass so close to building rooftops that they "feel... we can touch it", given the proximity of the runways. Jinnah Airport is surrounded by urban areas on all sides save for the north side, which leads to a scenario very similar to San Diego or Kai Tak with jets having to pass low over urban buildings before landing on one of the two runways. Edhi Foundation's Faisal Edhi said at least 25 houses suffered damage due to the crash. PIA's spokesman Abdullah Hafiz Khan has said that 18 houses were destroyed or badly damaged. According to a witness statement collected by Reuters, the plane hit a mobile phone tower in the vicinity of the airport as it crashed.

Aircraft
The crashed aircraft was an Airbus A320-214, built in 2004, with manufacturer's serial number 2274, and owned by GE Capital Aviation Services (GECAS). It made its maiden flight on 17 August 2004 and was leased to China Eastern Airlines as B-6017 between 2004 and 2014. It was then leased to Pakistan International Airlines (PIA) by GECAS on 31 October 2014, with registration AP-BLD. The plane was powered by CFM56-5B4/P engines, which were most recently installed in February and May 2019. The landing gear was installed in October 2014 and was next due for major servicing or replacement after 10 years in 2024.

The PIA's engineering department reported that the last routine maintenance check on the plane was conducted on 21 March 2020, and the most comprehensive check was last performed on 19 October 2019, during which no defects were found in its engines, landing gear or avionics. From 22 March to 7 May 2020, the plane had remained grounded owing to flight cancellations amid the global COVID-19 pandemic. From 7 May onward, the plane had conducted six flights. The Civil Aviation Authority had declared the aircraft fit for flight until 5 November. On the day prior to the incident, the plane had operated a flight from Muscat to Lahore and had logged 47,124 flight hours.

Victims

Pakistan International Airlines released details of the flight manifest which shows 91 passengers (51 men, 31 women, and 9 children); there were also eight crew members. The death toll was confirmed as 97, consisting solely of those on board the plane but later one of those injured on the ground died. One of the passengers was an American citizen. Among those killed is Pakistani model and actress Zara Abid. Five officers from the Pakistan Army and one from the Pakistan Air Force were also among the victims.

Meeran Yousaf, the spokesman of Sindh Health Department, has said eight residents of the Model Colony were injured in the crash and most victims' corpses had suffered burns. Most of the injured were women and children. Faisal Edhi said 25–30 people were hospitalized, mostly due to burns. Ten days after the accident, one of the injured residents, a child maid, died in the hospital due to burn injuries.

DNA testing was used to identify some of the victims. As of 10 June 2020, 95 people have been identified, per Federal Aviation Minister Ghulam Sarwar Khan. Edhi Foundation has reported about 19 bodies being taken away by relatives by force from its morgue, without providing proof to establish identity or waiting for identification through DNA testing. Some families of the victims have alleged that the DNA identification tests carried out by the authorities were improper, accusing them of delay and misidentification.

Aftermath 
The Sindh Minister of Health and Population Welfare declared a state of emergency for Karachi's hospitals, while Prime Minister Imran Khan ordered all available resources to the crash site, as did the chief of staff of the Pakistan Air Force. Khan also announced an inquiry, while PIA was reported to have shut down its website. The President, Arif Alvi, tweeted his condolences. Public figures across Pakistan expressed their sadness and shock at the incident. Many international leaders and celebrities also sent their condolences.

Pakistan had allowed domestic flights to resume, following suspension during the COVID-19 pandemic, six days earlier on 16 May. Since the crash occurred during the last days of Ramadan, many people were expected to travel to celebrate Eid al-Fitr with their families. The pandemic had already stretched the healthcare resources of the city and the crash intensified the burden. Consequently, one of the two survivors was moved to a public hospital in the city centre instead of hospitals closer to the crash site.

One of the survivors was identified as banker Zafar Masud, who is the CEO of the Bank of Punjab.

On 25 June 2020, 150 of 434 pilots employed by PIA were indefinitely grounded for holding "either bogus or suspicious licenses".

Five days later on 30 June, PIA was banned from flying into the European Union for six months for failing multiple safety tests and for failing to properly implement a safety management system, as stated in a letter sent to PIA from the European Union Air Safety Agency (EASA). The EASA stated that the decision could be appealed. The EASA also banned the airline from flying to the United Kingdom. On 9 July, PIA was banned from flying to the United States.

Investigation 
The investigation is being conducted by Pakistan's Aircraft Accident Investigation Board (AAIB). Airbus, the aircraft's manufacturer, stated they would be providing assistance to the investigation. Subsequently, an 11-member Airbus team visited the crash site on 26 May. The United States' National Transportation Safety Board (NTSB) also stated they would assist in the investigation.

The aircraft's flight data recorder (FDR) and cockpit voice recorder (CVR) were recovered and flown to France.

Ghulam Sarwar Khan, the federal minister for the Aviation Division, said that the full results of the inquiry would be made available within three months. The engines had scraped the runway three times on the pilot's first attempt to land, causing friction and sparks. The contact with the runway may have caused substantial damage to the engines' critical components located on the underside, consequently leading to failure.

In a report published on 22 June 2020, both the air traffic controller on duty and flight crew's actions were reported to have been contributing factors which ultimately culminated in the crash. In the report, the Captain was cited as being "overconfident".

A fourteen-page preliminary report on the accident was released on 24 June. Extracts from the cockpit voice recorder suggest the pilots were preoccupied in a non-operational conversation about the COVID-19 pandemic.

Landing was attempted without the landing gear extended.

Before the first landing attempt (according to the CVR and FDR), multiple alerts including the over speed and gear unsafe warning, as well as ground proximity warning system (GPWS) all sounded, but were either missed or disregarded by the flight crew. One of the airport's CCTV cameras recorded the aircraft's first landing attempt and screenshots from the recording were used in the preliminary report. The recording shows the aircraft touching down on the runway on its engines, with sparks resulting from friction with the asphalt at high speed.

After scraping the runway the crew initiated a go-around. A separate CCTV camera which recorded the impact showed that the aircraft's landing gear had been extended sometime between the first landing attempt and the crash.

See also 

 List of accidents and incidents involving the Airbus A320 family

Explanatory notes

References

External links 

 Press releases – Pakistan International Airlines
 Flight data on Flightradar24
 CCTV footage showing the moment the plane crashed

2020 disasters in Pakistan
2020 in Sindh
2020s in Karachi
Accidents and incidents involving the Airbus A320
Airliner accidents and incidents with an unknown cause
Aviation accidents and incidents in 2020
Aviation accidents and incidents in Pakistan
Disasters in Sindh
May 2020 events in Pakistan
Pakistan International Airlines accidents and incidents
Airliner accidents and incidents involving belly landings